Chipaya may refer to:
 Chipaya language, a language of Bolivia
 Chipaya (village), a village in Bolivia